Mompha sexstrigella is a moth in the family Momphidae. It has a Holarctic distribution. In Europe it is found in northern Fennoscandia and Estonia. It is also found in the Asian part of Russia, where it is known from the Altai mountains, southern Siberia and Sakhalin. In North America, it is found in Canada and the western United States.

The wingspan is 10–11 mm. There is one generation per year with adults on wing from the second half of June to the middle of August.

The larvae feed on Chamaenerion angustifolium. They mine the leaves of their host plant. The mine has the form of a gallery, widening into a blotch. Pupation takes place within the mine. Larvae can be found from July to August.

References

External links

Lepiforum e. V.
The Barcode of Life Data Systems (BOLD)

Moths described in 1921
Momphidae
Moths of Europe
Moths of Asia
Moths of North America